Maylandia mbenjii is a species of cichlid endemic to Lake Malawi where it is only known from Mbenji Island.  This species can reach a length of  SL.  It is also found in the aquarium trade.

References

mbenjii
Fish of Lake Malawi
Fish of Malawi
Fish described in 1997
Taxobox binomials not recognized by IUCN
Taxonomy articles created by Polbot